Terry Burgess may refer to:
 Terry Burgess (footballer)
 Terry Burgess (businessman)